Thea Knutzen (née Haaland; 4 July 1930 – 4 March 2016) was a Norwegian politician for the Conservative Party, born in Harstad.

Knutzen was a member of Sortland municipal council between 1967 and 1983, the last four years in the executive committee. She was elected to the Parliament of Norway from Nordland in 1985, and was re-elected in 1989. She had previously served in the position of deputy representative during the terms 1981–1985.

She died on 4 March 2016, aged 85.

References

1930 births
2016 deaths
People from Harstad
People from Sortland
Conservative Party (Norway) politicians
Women members of the Storting
Members of the Storting
20th-century Norwegian politicians
20th-century Norwegian women politicians